Bishop John C. Kilgo House is a historic home located at Charlotte, Mecklenburg County, North Carolina. It was built in 1915, and is a two-story, three bay, frame dwelling with Colonial Revival and Bungalow / American Craftsman design elements. It has a hipped roof, cubic main block with a later, 1950s rear, two-story, two-bay, gable-roofed addition. The front facade features a center bay, one-story entry porch with Tuscan order columns. It was built for Bishop John C. Kilgo (1861–1922), bishop of the Methodist Episcopal Church, South.

It was listed on the National Register of Historic Places in 2009.

References

Houses on the National Register of Historic Places in North Carolina
Colonial Revival architecture in North Carolina
Houses completed in 1915
Houses in Charlotte, North Carolina
National Register of Historic Places in Mecklenburg County, North Carolina